Karnali Zone was one of the fourteen zones located in the Mid-Western Development Region of Nepal. The headquarters of Karnali Zone was Jumla.

Karnali Zone was one of the poorest and most remote regions of Nepal, not very accessible by road yet. There are airfields in all districts except Kalikot which is connected seasonally by roadways to Jumla Airport.

Karnali Zone was the largest zone of Nepal, with two national parks.  Shey Phoksundo National Park Shey Phoksundo (with Phoksundo Lake—the deepest lake of Nepal), famous for the snow leopard, is Nepal's largest park with an area of 3,555 km2.  Rara National Park  surrounds Rara Lake—at 10.2 km2, Nepal's largest lake—known as the "Pearl of Nepal".

Administrative subdivisions
Karnali was divided into five districts; since 2015 these districts have been redesignated as part of Karnali Province.

See also
 Development Regions of Nepal (Former)
 List of zones of Nepal (Former)
 List of districts of Nepal

External links
 about karnali on nepali test

 
Zones of Nepal
Karnali Province
2015 disestablishments in Nepal